Sir Rowland Blennerhassett, 4th Baronet  (5 September 1839 – 22 March 1909) was a Roman Catholic Anglo-Irish baronet and Liberal Party politician from County Kerry.

Life
Blennerhassett was the son of Sir Arthur Blennerhassett, 3rd Baronet, whose ancestors had settled in Kerry under Queen Elizabeth, and his wife Sarah Mahony. He was educated at Downside School, Stonyhurst College and Christ Church, Oxford. He then spent time at the Université catholique de Louvain, before travelling in Germany. In 1849, he succeeded his father as baronet. 
When he returned to the United Kingdom, he started The Chronicle, a political and literary organ of liberal Catholicism. The first issue appeared on 23 March 1867, but its outspoken support for the Irish Home Rule movement made it unpopular. 
The last issue was published on 13 February 1868. 

Blennerhasset sat as a Liberal Member of Parliament for Galway Borough from 1865 to 1874 and for County Kerry from 1880 to 1885. He was High Sheriff of Kerry in 1866. His early support for Home Rule turned into opposition during the 1870s and he spoke openly against the politics of Charles Stewart Parnell. After leaving Parliament, Blennerhassett continued to be active in Irish public affairs. He contributed regularly to The Times and The Daily Telegraph and was a Justice of the Peace. In 1905, he was sworn of the Privy Council of Ireland.

In October 1901 he was awarded an honorary doctorate (LL.D.) by the Royal University of Ireland.

Family
He met Countess Charlotte Julia von Leyden and married her the same year on 9 June 1870. His wife was a noted biographer.

He was succeeded in his title by his eldest son, Arthur Charles Francis Bernard Blennerhassett.  His only daughter, Marie Carola Franciska Roselyne Blennerhassett, married Baron Raphael d'Erlanger and later Sir Henry Galway.

Blennerhassett went bankrupt in 1895; the family wealth lost, subsequent generations had to earn a living- his son and heir, the 5th baronet, was in the Colonial Service, the 6th baronet was an engineer, and the 7th baronet trained as a geologist, was the "front man for a foreign-owned investment firm in the City", and sold computer systems from his Chiswick home.

Notes

References

External links 

1839 births
1909 deaths
Baronets in the Baronetage of the United Kingdom
Deputy Lieutenants of Kerry
High Sheriffs of Kerry
Irish justices of the peace
Irish Liberal Party MPs
Members of the Privy Council of Ireland
People from County Kerry
UK MPs 1865–1868
UK MPs 1868–1874
UK MPs 1880–1885
Rowland
Alumni of Christ Church, Oxford
People educated at Stonyhurst College
People educated at Downside School
19th-century Anglo-Irish people
Members of the Parliament of the United Kingdom for County Galway constituencies (1801–1922)
Members of the Parliament of the United Kingdom for County Kerry constituencies (1801–1922)